Francis Ingoldsby (1615 – 1 October 1681) was an English politician who sat in the House of Commons between 1654 and 1659.

Ingoldsby was the son of Sir Richard Ingoldsby of Lenborough, Buckinghamshire and his wife Elizabeth Cromwell. He matriculated at Lincoln College, Oxford on 25 November 1631, aged 16. He sold his estate of Lenborough to his steward. In 1654 he was elected Member of Parliament for Buckingham for the First Protectorate Parliament. He was re-elected MP for Buckingham in 1656 for the Second Protectorate Parliament and again in 1659 for the Third Protectorate Parliament. On the Restoration, he was one of those nominated for the projected title of Knight of the Royal Oak. 
 
Ingoldsby died a pensioner of the Charterhouse, London in 1681.

Ingoldsby was the brother of Richard Ingoldsby who was one of the few regicides to be pardoned.

References

1615 births
1681 deaths
Alumni of Lincoln College, Oxford
People from Buckingham
English MPs 1654–1655
English MPs 1656–1658
English MPs 1659